Shippee may refer to:
W. A. Shippee, California State Senator
Shippee, Nebraska